Che Runqiu (born 25 October 1990 in Guangzhou, China), is a former Chinese-born Hong Kong professional footballer who played as a defender.

Club career
Che joined Hong Kong First Division club Tai Po in 2009. He started developed as a regular first team member in the 2011–12 season as he featured a total of 19 matches in the season. Che joined fellow First Division club Southern on 21 June 2013.

On 11 July 2017, Southern announced via Facebook that they had brought back Che.

On 29 July 2019, Che returned to Tai Po on a permanent basis.

International career
On 21 June 2013, Che was selected into the 28-men Hong Kong under-23 training squad for the 2013 East Asian Cup.

Career statistics

Club
 As of 5 May 2013.

1 Others include Hong Kong Season Play-offs.

Honors

Club
Tai Po
Hong Kong Senior Shield: 2012–13

References

External links
 

1990 births
Living people
Footballers from Guangzhou
Association football midfielders
Association football defenders
Hong Kong footballers
Chinese footballers
Expatriate footballers in Hong Kong
Tai Po FC players
Southern District FC players
South China AA players
Hong Kong First Division League players
Hong Kong Premier League players